The Clarinda Antelopes were a minor league baseball team based in Clarinda, Iowa. Clarinda played as members of the Class D level Southwest Iowa League in 1903 and the Missouri-Iowa-Nebraska-Kansas League in 1910 and 1911, hosting home games at the Clarinda Ball Park.

History
Minor league baseball began in Clarinda, Iowa in 1903. The Clarinda team played as charter members of the six–team Class D level Southwest Iowa League. The teams from Atlantic, the Creston Cyclones, the Osceola, Iowa team, the Red Oak Blue Indians and Shenandoah joined Clarinda in league play. Clarinda finished their first season of play with a record of 31–30, placing 2nd in the Southwest Iowa League standings under managers Al Johnson, Guy Strickler and Depew. Clarinda finished 3.5 games behind the 1st place Atlantic team in the league standings. The Southwest Iowa League permanently folded after their only season in 1903.

Minor league baseball returned to Clarinda in 1910. The 1910 Clarinda "Antelopes" began play as charter members of the Class D level Missouri-Iowa-Nebraska-Kansas League, known informally as the MINK League. Clarinda finished the 1910 season with a record of 56–42, placing 2nd in the MINK standings, 1.5 games behind the champion Falls City Colts. The Antelopes played under manager Rudy Kling Playing home games at the Clarinda Ball Park, season attendance was 12,736, an average of 260 per game.

In their final season, the Clarinda Antelopes placed 5th in 1911 Missouri-Illinois-Nebraska- Kansas League standings. The Antelopes ended the season with a 43–57 record under manager Frank Hutchinson, finishing 16.0 games behind the 1st place Maryville Comets/Humboldt Infants. The Clarinda franchise folded after the season.

Clarinda, Iowa has not hosted another minor league franchise.

Today, Clarinda is home to the Clarinda A's, a collegiate summer baseball team,  who play as members of the M.I.N.K. Collegiate Baseball League. Baseball Hall of Fame member Ozzie Smith played for the Clarinda A's.

The ballpark
The Clarinda and Clarinda Antelope minor league teams were noted to have played home games at the Clarinda Ball Park. The name corresponds to Clarinda City Park. Still in use today as a public park with four ballfields, Clarinda City Park is located at 1140 East Main Street, Clarinda, Iowa.

Timeline

Year–by–year records

Notable alumni
Rudy Kling (1910, MGR)

See also
Clarinda Antelopes players

References

External links
Baseball Reference

Defunct minor league baseball teams
Professional baseball teams in Iowa
Defunct baseball teams in Iowa
Baseball teams established in 1910
Baseball teams disestablished in 1911
Page County, Iowa
Clarinda, Iowa
1903 establishments in Iowa
Missouri-Iowa-Nebraska-Kansas League (minor league) teams